The Pakleni or sometimes referred as Paklinski islands are located off the southwest coast of the island of Hvar, Croatia, opposite the entrance to the Hvar (city) harbour. Usual local name is Škoji, which means Islands. The name is popularly translated as Hells' islands (pakleni: hellish), but it originally derives from paklina, an archaic word, from which pakleni is derived. too. "Paklina" means "tar", and in this case refers to the pine resin once used to coat ships that was harvested on these islands.

Overview 
The islands are (from west to east):

The main island of Sveti Klement is also called Veliki otok or Big island. It has 3 settlements, Palmižana, Momica Polje and Vlaka. There is a large, well protected yacht marina at Palmižana.

The islands are a popular destination for visitors with smaller craft, especially yachts, providing numerous peaceful coves for diving, underwater fishing, swimming and water sports.

See also 
 Croatia
 Dalmatia
 Hvar

References

Islands of Croatia
Islands of the Adriatic Sea
Landforms of Split-Dalmatia County